Rohan Bopanna and Divij Sharan were the defending champions, but chose not to participate together. Bopanna played alongside Arjun Kadhe but lost in the first round to Antoine Hoang and Benoît Paire. Sharan teamed up with Artem Sitak but lost in the first round to Matthew Ebden and Leander Paes.

André Göransson and Christopher Rungkat won the title, defeating Jonathan Erlich and Andrei Vasilevski in the final, 6–2, 3–6, [10–8].

Seeds

Draw

Draw

References

External links
Main Draw

Doubles